Monegasque Rugby Federation is the governing body for the sport of rugby union in Monaco. The union was established in 1996.

See also
 Rugby union in Monaco
 Monaco national rugby union team

External links
 Monaco Rugby.com
 Monaco on IRB.com

Rugby union in Monaco
Rugby union governing bodies in Europe
Rugby union
Sports organizations established in 1996